The Archdeacon of Colchester is a senior ecclesiastical officer in the Diocese of Chelmsford – she or he has responsibilities within her archdeaconry (the Archdeaconry of Colchester) including oversight of church buildings and some supervision, discipline and pastoral care of the clergy.

History
The title first appears in sources before 1144, as one of four archdeacons in the (then much larger) Diocese of London, but there had been four archdeacons prior to this point, some of whom may be regarded as essentially predecessors in the line of the Colchester archdeacons. The territorial archdeaconry remained part of the London diocese for about 700 years, until, on 1 January 1846, it was transferred by Order in Council to the Diocese of Rochester. The archdeaconry was afterwards in the newly created Diocese of St Albans from 4 May 1877 until her transfer to the Diocese of Chelmsford upon her creation on 23 January 1914. On 1 February 2013, by Pastoral Order of the Bishop of Chelmsford, the new Archdeaconry of Stansted was created from the Colchester archdeaconry; initially, the Archdeacon of Colchester was also Acting Archdeacon of Stansted.

List of archdeacons

High Medieval
bef. 1102–aft. 1115: Quintilian
bef. 1115–aft. 1132: Cyprian son of Quintilian
bef. 1138–aft. 1138: Geoffrey
bef. 1142–aft. 1152: Ailward
?– (ren.): Henry of London (renounced claim)
bef. 1155–aft. 1166: William
bef. 1168–aft. 1178: Richard Foliot I
aft. 1180–aft. 1190: Ralph de Alta Ripa
bef. 1192–bef. 1217 (d.): Richard of Ely
bef. 1218–1228 (res.): Roger Niger
bef. 1231–1238 (d.): Hugh of London II
bef. 1248–aft. 1252: Robert de Insula
bef. 1249–aft. 1249: Ralph de Insula (very probably vice-archdeacon)
aft. 1253–aft. 1260: Hugh de Sancto Edmundo
aft. 1263–21 November 1285 (d.): Fulke Lovell
bef. 1287–aft. 1299: Giles Filliol

Late Medieval
bef. 1302–aft. 1302: Richard Newport
bef. 1304–aft. 1310: John de Chishull
bef. 1311–bef. 1336 (d.): William de Meleford
3 March 1337–bef. 1348: William de Stowe
bef. 1348–bef. 1362 (d.): Richard de Plessis
10 April 1363 – 26 September 1373 (exch.): Michael Northburgh (son)
26 September 1373 – 1387 (d.): Richard de Piriton
bef. 1393–bef. 1398 (res.): John de Carleton
3 November 1398 – 1406 (res.): Thomas More (afterwards Dean of St Paul's)
17 January 1406 – 24 November 1411 (exch.): Richard de Kingston
24 November 1411–bef. 1425 (d.): William Spygurnell
7 February 1425 (installed): Henry Wodechurche (evidently ineffective)
14 February 1425 (installed): Peter Hynewyk (evidently ineffective)
23 March 1425–bef. 1433 (res.): William Duffield
19 May 1433–bef. 1440 (res.): John Stopyngton
3 April 1440–bef. 1449 (d.): Robert Aiscough
15 February 1449 – 1450 (res.): Nicholas Close
bef. 1450–aft. 1450: John Thurston
bef. 1451–1465 (res.): Robert Stillington
10 February 1466–bef. 1483 (d.): Benedict Burgh
18 July 1483–bef. 1499 (d.): Thomas Barow
9 July 1499–bef. 1509: John Maynwaring
bef. 1509–bef. 1519 (d.): John Perott
16 February–October 1519 (res.): Richard Pace
22 October 1519 – 1523 (res.): John Clerk
19 November 1523 – 1531 (res.): Edward Lee
30 December 1531 – 1537 (res.): Robert Aldrich
1 October 1537–bef. 1543 (d.): Richard Curwen

Early modern
23 March 1543 – 1552 (d.): Anthony Belasyse
10 January 1553 – 22 January 1554 (rem.): John Standish
22 January 1554–bef. 1557: Hugh Weston (deprived of office for immorality)
15 October 1558 – 23 October 1559 (deprived): John Standish (again; deprived)
4 December 1559–bef. 1565 (d.): John Pullain
16 July 1565 – 1570: James Calfhill
11 October 1570–aft. 1593: George Withers
8 January 1596–bef. 1617 (d.): Thomas Withers
10 April 1617 – 1641 (res.): Henry King
15 April 1642 – 22 June 1643 (d.): Josias Shute
22 June 1643–bef. 1660: Vacancy (English Interregnum)
bef. 1660–1667 (d.): John Hansley
2 February 1667–bef. 1675 (d.): William Wells
25 August 1675–bef. 1678 (d.): Charles Smith
24 September 1678–September 1681 (res.): William Sill
3 November 1681 – 1704 (res.): William Beveridge
9 August 1704 – 9 August 1722 (d.): Jonas Warley
14 August 1722 – 4 August 1737 (d.): John King
24 August 1737 – 8 November 1749 (d.): Thomas Cartwright
29 November 1749 – 1766 (res.): Charles Moss
12 December 1766 – 19 January 1775 (d.): William Powell
6 February 1775 – 4 October 1812 (d.): Anthony Hamilton
16 November 1812 – 28 December 1821 (d.): Joseph Jefferson
15 January 1822 – 1824 (res.): Charles James Blomfield
4 June 1824–bef. 1841 (res.): William Lyall
7 July 1841 – 27 March 1845 (d.): Herbert Oakeley
28 August 1845 – 1 November 1864 (d.): Charles Burney
The archdeaconry was transferred to the Rochester diocese on 1 January 1846.

Late modern
1864–1882: William Ady
The archdeaconry was transferred to the new St Albans diocese on 4 May 1877.
1882–1894 (d.): Alfred Blomfield, Bishop suffragan of Colchester
1894–7 December 1908 (d.): Henry Johnson, Bishop suffragan of Colchester
1909–19 March 1922 (d.): Robert Whitcombe, Bishop suffragan of Colchester
The archdeaconry was transferred to the new Chelmsford diocese on 23 January 1914.
1922–1933 (ret.): Thomas Chapman, Bishop suffragan of Colchester
1933–1946 (ret.): Charles Ridsdale, Bishop suffragan of Colchester
1946–1959 (res.): Dudley Narborough, Bishop suffragan of Colchester
1959–1969 (ret.): Aubrey Cleall (afterwards archdeacon emeritus)
1969–1972 (res.): Roderic Coote, Bishop suffragan of Colchester
1972–1976 (res.): Derek Bond
1977–1983 (res.): James Roxburgh
1983–1997 (ret.): Ernest Stroud (afterwards archdeacon emeritus)
1997–2003 (res.): Martin Wallace
2004November 2018 (ret.): Annette Cooper
12 May 2019present: Ruth Patten

Notes

References

Sources

Lists of Anglicans
 
Lists of English people